The Department of Defence Co-ordination was an Australian government department that existed between November 1939 and April 1942.

History
The department was formed shortly after Australia declared war on Germany in September 1939, joining World War II. In November 1939 the Department of Defence (II) was separated into the Department of Defence Co-ordination and Departments of Air, Navy and Army.

Scope
Information about the department's functions and/or government funding allocation could be found in the Administrative Arrangements Orders, the annual budget statements and in the Department's annual reports.

When it was established, the Department dealt with:
Defence policy
Administrative co-ordination and review
Financial Co-ordination and review
Works Co-ordination and review
Commonwealth War Book
Civilian defence and State Co-operation

Structure
The Department was a Commonwealth Public Service department, staffed by officials who were responsible to the Minister for Defence Co-ordination: Robert Menzies (1939 to 1941) and John Curtin (1941 to 1942).

The Secretary of the Department was Frederick Shedden.

References

Ministries established in 1939
Defence Co-ordination
1939 establishments in Australia
1942 disestablishments in Australia